Clapham Town is an administrative division of the London Borough of Lambeth, England.

The ward contains much of Clapham including part of Clapham Common and Clapham Common Underground station. At the 2011 census the population was 13,795.

The ward is located in the Vauxhall parliamentary constituency.

Lambeth Council elections

External links
Lambeth Borough Council profile for the ward
Clapham Town election results on Lambeth website
Clapham Town councillors' blog

References

Wards of the London Borough of Lambeth